Tribeca Productions is an American film and television production company co-founded in 1989 by actor Robert De Niro and producer Jane Rosenthal in the lower Manhattan neighborhood of Tribeca.

History
The production company was founded in 1989 at the beginning of a revival of interest in the film production community in filming in New York City. Prior to the 1990s it made more economic sense for production companies to film urban scenes in cities such as Montreal, Toronto, and Vancouver in Canada. Since the founding of Tribeca Productions other production facilities have moved into various neighborhoods in NYC and filming around the city and in the streets has again become commonplace.

In 2003, Robert De Niro, Jane Rosenthal, and Craig Hatkoff moved Tribeca Productions to become a part of Tribeca Enterprises, which organizes the Tribeca Film Festival, Tribeca Film Festival International, Tribeca Cinemas, and Tribeca Film.

Filmography

References

Film production companies of the United States
Entertainment companies established in 1989
American film studios
Television production companies of the United States
Companies based in New York City
Tribeca
Robert De Niro